Bangarh is an ancient city situated in Gangarampur, West Bengal, India. Bangarh was the ancient city which was the administrative centre of Kotivarsha Vishaya (territorial division), itself part of the wider administrative unit of Pundravardhana Bhukti, which had Mahasthangarh as its capital in the period of Chandras, Varmans and Senas. After the Senas were defeated by the Muslims under Muhammad Bakhtiyar Khalji, Devkot was established as their capital where Muhammad Bakhtiyar Khalji died.

Geography

Location
Bangarh is located at 

In the map alongside, all places marked on the map are linked in the full screen version.

History
The earliest mentions about the Kotivarsha town are found in the Vayu Purana (XXIII,209) and the Brihat Samhita (XI, II). Lexicographers, Hemchandra (the Abhidhanachintamani IV,977) and Purushottama (in his Trikandashesha) have mentioned the city by several names – Uma(Usha?)vana, Banapura, and Shonitapura. Sandhyakara Nandi in his Ramacharita described at length about the temples and the lakes of the city. The ruins of the city are found in Bangarh, which is located at Gangarampur city, about 45 km south of Balurghat city, in Dakshin Dinajpur district of West Bengal state in eastern India. There was a Buddhist monastery at Devikota.

Muslim rule was first established in Bengal in 1204 by Muhammad Bakhtiyar Khalji. The kingdom was called Lakhnawati or Lakhnauti. The capital was located sometimes at Lakhnawati and sometimes at Devkot. Bakhtiyar Khalji died at Devkot in 1205–06, possibly murdered by Ali Mardan Khalji, who was governor of Naran-Koh,>

Excavations at Bangarh 
The earliest excavations at Bangarh was carried out by a team led by K.G. Goswami during 1938–41. Located on the bank of the Punarbhaba, the excavated site reflects its urban character. The site has its core in the form of a citadel surrounded by mud ramparts (area about 25 hectares) which dates from the earliest phase of the site. The earliest phase remains uncertain, as the excavations could not reach the natural soil. The citadel area revealed five cultural phases dating from the time of the Mauryas to the medieval period. The initial phase (the Mauryan period) indicates that the city had a modest beginning in which it had probably a mud rampart wall. It was only in the following phase (the Kushana period, 200 BCE - 300 CE) a brick built wide rampart wall is found with drains, cesspits and residential buildings made of burnt bricks of a very large size, showing distinct signs of prosperity and burgeoning urbanism. The excavated materials of the Gupta period are not comparable with the richness and diversity of those belonging to Kushana cultural phase. Though the late Gupta phase of Bangarh is marked by decadence, particularly in terms of building activities, the Pala period (mid 8th century -12th century), in sharp contrast, indicates a picture of efflorescence.  Rampart walls, compound walls, residential quarters, temples with ambulatory path and its enclosing walls, damp proof granaries, bathrooms, drains and ring wells suggest a prosperous condition of the city.

References

External links

 

Gangarampur
Indo-Aryan archaeological sites
Archaeological sites in West Bengal